Triassic Parq is a musical comedy with music by Marshall Pailet, and lyrics and book by Marshall Pailet, Bryce Norbitz and Steve Wargo.

Synopsis

The novel and film Jurassic Park told from the perspective of the dinosaurs. A clan of genetically engineered female dinosaurs (played by male and female actors) is thrown into chaos when one of the female dinosaurs spontaneously turns male. Originally directed by Marshall Pailet and presented Off-Broadway at the Soho Playhouse in 2012. The original cast featured Alex Wyse (Velociraptor of Innocence), Wade McCollum (Velociraptor of Faith), Lindsay Nicole Chambers (Velociraptor of Science), Shelley Thomas (T-Rex 1), Claire Neumann (T-Rex 2), Brandon Espinoza (Mime-a-saurus), Morgan Freeman (Lee Seymour) and Zak Sandler (Pianosaurus).

Production History

Originally produced in 2010 at the NY International Fringe Festival under the title Jurassic Parq: The Broadway Musical" where it won "Best Overall Musical/Production." After Off-Broadway, it was slightly re-written and presented at the Chance Theater in Orange County where it won the Ovation Award for "Best Production of a Musical (Intimate Theater)" in addition to two other awards.

Recordings
 Original cast recording
Original Release Date: 2012 

Label: Starkadia

Music: Marshall Pailet

Lyrics: Marshall Pailet, Bryce Norbitz and Steve Wargo

Director: Marshall Pailet

Music Director: Zak Sandler

 Alex Wyse – Velociraptor of Innocence
 Wade McCollum – Velociraptor of Faith
 Lindsay Nicole Chambers – Velociraptor of Science
 Shelley Thomas – T-Rex 1
 Claire Neumann – T-Rex 2
 Brandon Espinoza – Mime-a-saurus
 Morgan Freeman - Lee Seymour
 Zak Sandler - Pianosaurus

References

External links
 Official Website
 AP Reviews Triassic Parq
 LA Times Review Triassic Parq
 Licensing Website

Original musicals
2010 musicals
Off-Broadway musicals